is a passenger railway station located in the city of Ōtsu, Shiga Prefecture, Japan, operated by the private railway company Keihan Electric Railway.

Lines

Station layout
The station consists of two opposed unnumbered side platforms connected by a level crossing. There is no station building, but only a sheet built directly on the platform. The station is unattended.

Platforms

Adjacent stations

History
Shigasato Station was opened on May 15, 1927. In May 1955, the station was relocated 400 meters towards Ishiyamadera Station from its original location.

Passenger statistics
In fiscal 2018, the station was used by an average of 932 passengers daily (boarding passengers only).

Surrounding area
Shigasato Hospital
 Shigasato Post Office
 Japan National Route 161

See also
List of railway stations in Japan

References

External links

Keihan official home page

Railway stations in Shiga Prefecture
Stations of Keihan Electric Railway
Railway stations in Japan opened in 1927
Railway stations in Ōtsu